Cymdeithas Edward Llwyd (English: Edward Llwyd Society) is a Welsh natural history organization whose name commemorates the great Welsh natural historian, geographer and linguist Edward Llwyd (1660–1709).

The Cymdeithas Edward Llwyd organizes regular country walks throughout Wales in sites of interest of the Welsh environment, including SSSIs and post-industrial landscapes. These are Welsh-language walking groups, although learners are just as welcome.

They also organize a variety of nature and environmental activities, including lectures, publications and conservation work. They have worked on collecting and documenting the names of natural species.

in 2010 society held a conference on Welsh toponymy, at which it was agreed to form the Welsh Place-Name Society.

References

External links
Official site

Environmental organisations based in Wales
Natural history